Thiruverumbur is a state assembly constituency in Tiruchirappalli district in Tamil Nadu. Its State Assembly Constituency number is 142. It comes under Tiruchirappalli Lok Sabha constituency for Parliament elections. It consists of Thuvakudi Municipality, Thiruverumbur Panchyat Union, and parts of Trichy City Municipal Corporation. Most successful party: DMK (7 times). It is one of the 234 State Legislative Assembly Constituencies in Tamil Nadu.

Members of the Assembly

Election results

2021

2016

2011

2006

2001

1996

1991

1989

1984

1980

1977

1971

1967

References 

 

Assembly constituencies of Tamil Nadu
Tiruchirappalli district